"Black Night" is a blues song recorded by Charles Brown in 1951. Although the songwriter credit is usually given to Jessie Mae Robinson, "Brown is believed to have written 'Black Night'", according to author Steve Sullivan.

Background
A slow minor-key blues, it is performed in the West Coast blues-style.  Brown, on vocal and piano, is backed by a small combo with the addition of Maxwell Davis on saxophone.

"Black Night" was Brown's second single to reach number one on Billboard's R&B chart.  It remained at the top position for 14 weeks, longer than any other single.  In 2005, it was inducted into the Blues Foundation Blues Hall of Fame as a "Classic of Blues RecordingSingle or Album Track".

The song is included on numerous compilations of Brown's music as well as collections of West Coast blues and R&B music. In 1971, Brown re-recorded it for his album Blues 'n' Brown (1972).

Cover versions
Many musicians have adapted "Black Night" in a variety of styles and the Blues Foundation notes renditions by: 
Bobby Bland went to #99 on the Hot 100 in 1964
Dr. John
Willie Nelson
Muddy Waters.

References

1951 singles
Charles Brown (musician) songs
Blues songs
1951 songs
Songs written by Jessie Mae Robinson
Aladdin Records singles